The 1980–81 Quebec Nordiques season was the Nordiques second season in the National Hockey League.  Quebec improved on their inaugural NHL season, making the playoffs, only to lose in the first round.

Off-season
During the off-season, the Nordiques fired head coach Jacques Demers, and general manager Maurice Filion would begin the season as the head coach.  This would mark Filion's third time behind the Nordiques bench, as he was the head coach of the club in the 1972–73 WHA season, and he served as an interim head coach at the end of the 1977–78 season.  Quebec was able to sign brothers Peter Stastny and Anton Stastny, who both defected from Czechoslovakia.  The brothers would have a huge impact in the league, as Peter would win the Calder Memorial Trophy awarded to the NHL's Rookie of the Year, and both Peter and Anton would set rookie records, each earning eight points in a game on February 22, 1981, leading Quebec to an 11-7 win over the Washington Capitals.

Regular season
The Nordiques season began with a nine-game road trip, and head coach Maurice Filion would replace himself with Michel Bergeron after the club had a 1-3-2 record in their opening six games.  Quebec continued to struggle, and fifteen games into the season, they had a 1-9-5 record.  The Nordiques would continue to struggle, and found themselves a season high fourteen games under .500 with an 11-26-12 record after 49 games.  Quebec would then get red hot, posting a record of 19-6-6 in their remaining 31 games to finish the season at 30-32-18, earning 78 points, and their first ever berth into the NHL playoffs.

Offensively, the Nordiques were led by rookie Peter Stastny, who set a team record with 109 points, winning the Calder Memorial Trophy.  Jacques Richard became the first Nordique to score over 50 goals in a season, as he scored 52, and registered 103 points. Anton Stastny also had a great rookie season, earning 85 points, while Robbie Ftorek and Michel Goulet had 75 and 73 points respectively.  Pierre Lacroix led the Nordiques blueline, earning 39 points, while Dale Hunter had a team high 226 penalty minutes.

In goal, Dan Bouchard emerged as the number one goalie late in the season, winning a team record 19 games, while posting a team best 3.17 GAA, along with two shutouts.  Michel Plasse had the most playing time, and he won 10 games with a 3.66 GAA in 33 games.

Season standings

Schedule and results

Playoffs
The Nordiques opened the 1981 Stanley Cup playoffs with a best of five preliminary round against the Philadelphia Flyers.  The Flyers finished the season with a 41-24-15 record, earning 97 points, and second place in the Patrick Division.  The series opened up with two games at the Philadelphia Spectrum, and in the series opener, the Flyers took a 1-0 lead on a goal by Brian Propp early in the game.  The Nordiques Anton Stastny tied the game, however, the Flyers Bill Barber made it 2-1, and then Brian Propp added a second goal before the first period was over to give the Flyers a 3-1 lead.  In the second period, Quebec fought back on goals by Michel Goulet and Dale Hunter to tie the game at 3-3.  Philadelphia took control of the game in the third period, as Paul Holmgren and Al Hill made it 5-3 for the Flyers before Anton Stastny scored his second of the game for Quebec, making it 5-4 Flyers.  Bill Barber scored an empty net goal in the last minute, as the Flyers took the series opener 6-4.

In the second game, the Flyers took an early 2-0 lead in the first period on goals by Bill Barber and Mel Bridgman before Peter Stastny responded for the Nordiques, cutting the Flyers lead to 2-1.  Bill Barber added a second goal late in the first period, giving the Flyers a 3-1 lead.  Anton Stastny cut the Flyers lead to 3-2 with a goal early in the second, however, Bill Barber completed the hat trick 5:55 into the period, giving Philadelphia a 4-2 lead.  The Flyers Tom Gorence made it 5-2 Philadelphia before Jacques Richard responded for the Nordiques, making it 5-3 after two periods.  In the third period, Ken Linseman made it 6-3 for Philadelphia before the Nordiques fought back with two quick goals, one by Dale Hunter and another by Marc Tardif, putting the Nordiques within a goal at 6-5.  Philadelphia's Mel Bridgman scored, followed by an empty net goal by Bobby Clarke, as the Flyers took a 2-0 series lead with an 8-5 victory.

The series shifted to Le Colisée for the next two games, and after two scoreless periods, the Nordiques Michel Goulet scored midway through the third to give the Nordiques a 1-0 lead.  Peter Stastny scored late in the game, as Quebec shutout the Flyers 2-0, with Dan Bouchard made 32 saves, earning the victory and shutout.

In the fourth game, the Flyers Terry Murray scored seven seconds into the game, as Philadelphia took an early 1-0 lead.  Robbie Ftorek responded for the Nordiques, however, the Flyers Behn Wilson and Tom Gorence added goals in the opening period, as the Flyers took a 3-1 lead.  After a scoreless second period, and with the Nordiques facing elimination, Dale Hunter cut into the Flyers lead with a goal with less than five minutes remaining in the third period, making the score 3-2 for Philadelphia.  Less than two minutes later, Jacques Richard completed the comeback, as the Nordiques scored to make it 3-3, heading into overtime.  In overtime, Dale Hunter scored a quick goal 37 seconds into the extra period, as Quebec stunned the Flyers with a 4-3 win, and tied the series.

The fifth game was played in Philadelphia, and the Flyers opened the scoring on a goal by Rick MacLeish late in the first period.  The Nordiques Michel Goulet quickly responded before the period was over, tying the game.  In the second period, the Flyers re-took the lead, when Al Hill scored ten minutes into the period, making it 2-1 Philadelphia.  In the third period, the Flyers took control of the game, scoring three quick goals to make it 5-1.  Quebec's Anton Stastny scored to make it 5-2, however, that would be as close of the Nordiques got, as the Flyers won the game and took the series.

Philadelphia Flyers 3, Quebec Nordiques 2

Player statistics

Scoring leaders

Goaltending

Awards
 Calder Memorial Trophy: Peter Šťastný

Draft picks
Quebec's draft picks from the 1980 NHL Entry Draft which was held at the Montreal Forum in Montreal, Quebec.

Transactions
The Nordiques were involved in the following transactions during the 1980–81 season.

Trades

Waivers

Free agents

References

External links
SHRP Sports
The Internet Hockey Database
Hockey Reference
Goalies Archive

Quebec Nordiques season, 1980-81
Quebec Nordiques seasons
Que